Amgarhi is a village located in the periphery of Corbett National Park, Uttarakhand, India. Its name derives from its mango (aam) orchids. It is located 15 km from Ramnagar, and can be accessed by forest road from near the crossing of the Kosi barrage on Ramnagar - Haldwani Road. Features of this location include step farms, old houses, adjoining jungle, and streams.

Uttarakhand